Niklas Larsen (born 22 March 1997) is a Danish professional track and road racing cyclist, who currently rides for UCI ProTeam . He rode in the men's team pursuit at the 2016 UCI Track Cycling World Championships winning a bronze medal.

Major results

Road

2014
 1st  Time trial, National Junior Championships
2015
 1st Stage 2a (ITT) Trofeo Karlsberg
 7th Time trial, UCI World Junior Championships
2017
 1st  Mountains classification, Ronde van Midden-Nederland
 4th Time trial, National Under-23 Championships
 6th Duo Normand (with Kasper Asgreen)
2018
 1st Eschborn–Frankfurt U23
 1st Stage 1 Rhône-Alpes Isère Tour
 2nd Road race, National Under-23 Championships
2019
 1st  Overall Danmark Rundt
1st  Young rider classification
 1st Himmerland Rundt
 1st Lillehammer GP
 2nd  Road race, UEC European Under-23 Championships
 2nd Skive–Løbet
 3rd Road race, National Championships
 5th Gylne Gutuer
 7th Overall Tour d'Eure-et-Loir
2020
 1st Stage 1 (TTT) Giro del Friuli-Venezia Giulia
2021
 1st Fyen Rundt
 3rd GP Herning

Track

2015
 2nd  Team pursuit, UEC European Junior Championships
2016
 1st  Points, UEC European Championships
 2nd Team pursuit, UCI World Cup, Hong Kong
 3rd  Team pursuit, Olympic Games
 3rd  Team pursuit, UCI World Championships
2017
 UCI Track World Cup
1st Team pursuit, Cali
1st Madison (with Casper von Folsach), Cali
1st Omnium, Pruszków
2nd Points, Cali
 UEC European Under-23 Championships
1st  Points
2nd  Omnium
3rd  Scratch
 UEC European Championships
2nd  Madison (with Casper Pedersen)
2nd  Points
2018
 2nd  Team pursuit, UCI World Championships
2021
 2nd  Team pursuit, Olympic Games

References

External links

1997 births
Living people
Danish male cyclists
People from Slagelse
Danish track cyclists
Olympic cyclists of Denmark
Cyclists at the 2016 Summer Olympics
Medalists at the 2016 Summer Olympics
Medalists at the 2020 Summer Olympics
Cyclists at the 2020 Summer Olympics
Olympic silver medalists for Denmark
Olympic bronze medalists for Denmark
Olympic medalists in cycling
Sportspeople from Region Zealand